School Trip is a 2002 German-Polish drama film directed by .

Cast 
 Steven Sperling - Ronny
 Sophie Kempe - Isa
  - Martina
 Jakob Panzek - Steven
 Bartek Blaszczyk - Marek
 Fritz Roth - Teacher

References

External links 
 

2002 drama films
2002 films
German drama films
Polish drama films
2000s German films